Muḥammad ibn Mūsā can refer to:
 Muḥammad ibn Mūsā al-Khwārizmī, 9th century mathematician
 Muḥammad ibn Mūsā ibn Shākir, 9th century scientist, eldest of the Banū Mūsā